Splicing factor 3A subunit 3 is a protein that in humans is encoded by the SF3A3 gene.

This gene encodes subunit 3 of the splicing factor 3a protein complex. The splicing factor 3a heterotrimer includes subunits 1, 2 and 3 and is necessary for the in vitro conversion of 15S U2 snRNP into an active 17S particle that performs pre-mRNA splicing. Subunit 3 interacts with subunit 1 through its amino-terminus while the zinc finger domain of subunit 3 plays a role in its binding to the 15S U2 snRNP. This gene has a pseudogene on chromosome 20.

Interactions
SF3A3 has been shown to interact with SF3A1.

References

Further reading